Mazhnabad (also Romanized as Mazhnābād, Majnābād, Mazhan Abad, and Mozhnābād; also known as Mijnābād) is a village in Bostan Rural District, Sangan District, Khaf County, Razavi Khorasan Province, Iran. At the 2006 census, its population was 1,854, in 371 families.

References 

Populated places in Khaf County